Mean Jeans are a Portland, Oregon-based punk rock band formed in 2006 by guitarist Billy Jeans and drummer Jeans Wilder. They are known for their loud, humorous, fun-loving songs, and for their music's intentional resemblance to that of the Ramones.

Discography

Studio albums
Are You Serious? (Dirtnap, 2009)
On Mars (Dirtnap, 2012)
Tight New Dimension (Fat Wreck Chords, 2016)
Jingles Collection (Fat Wreck Chords, 2018)
Gigantic Sike (Fat Wreck Chords, 2019)

Singles
Stoned 2 the Bone (Rehab single, 2008)
Tears in My Beers/Cool 2 Drive (Trouble in Mind single, 2010)

EPs
License to Chill (Dirtnap EP, 2009)

References

Musical groups from Portland, Oregon
Musical groups established in 2006
Punk rock groups from Oregon
2006 establishments in Oregon
Fat Wreck Chords artists
Dirtnap Records artists